The Villa de Pitanxo was a Spanish fishing trawler that sank off the coast of Newfoundland and Labrador, Canada, on February 15, 2022. Twenty-one people died in the sinking.

Background 
At approximately 2:30 am, on February 15, 2022, the Villa de Pitanxos emergency beacon was activated, initiating a search and rescue effort by the Joint Rescue Coordination Centre Halifax.

See also
 Weather of 2022
 List of maritime disasters in the 21st century

References

2022 disasters in Canada
2022 in Spain
February 2022 events in Canada
Maritime incidents in 2022
Fishing in Canada
Fishing vessels of Spain
Canada–Spain relations
2022 meteorology